The 2020 South Carolina Gamecocks baseball team represented the University of South Carolina in the 2020 NCAA Division I baseball season. The Gamecocks played their home games at Founders Park.

Previous season

The Gamecocks finished 28–28 overall, and 8–22 in the conference.

Personnel

Roster

Coaching Staff

Schedule and results

Schedule Source:
*Rankings are based on the team's current ranking in the D1Baseball poll.

2020 MLB Draft

References

South Carolina
South Carolina Gamecocks baseball seasons
South Carolina Gamecocks baseball